The House of the County or Casa do Condado is since 2007 the museum of Vila Pouca de Aguiar in Portugal. It includes a collection of cultural goods constituted by archaeological and ethnographic materials of great value from the region.

The House of the County or 'Casa do Condado' is the place of birth of Doctor Martiniano Ferreira Botelho.

References 
In III volume do Dicionário dos mais ilustres Transmontanos e Alto Durienses, coordenado por Barroso da Fonte, 656 páginas, Capa dura. Editora Cidade Berço.
 In «Machado de Vila Pouca de Aguiar», Porto 2000, de Manuel Abranches de Soveral.
 Diário da República APÊNDICE N.o 30—II SÉRIE—N.o 64—30 de Março de 2006 - Aviso n.o 915/2006 (2.a série) — AP.—

Museums established in 2007
Museums in Vila Real District
Archaeological museums in Portugal
Ethnographic museums in Portugal